Taher Benkhelifa (born 10 June 1994 in Djelfa) is an Algerian footballer who plays for Algerian Ligue Professionnelle 1 club USM Alger.

Career
In the summer of 2018, Benkhelifa signed a one-year loan contract with JS Kabylie.

In 2019, He signed a one-year loan contract with USM Alger.

In 2020, Taher Benkhelifa signed a three-year contract with USM Alger.

References

External links
 

1994 births
Living people
Algerian footballers
Association football midfielders
USM Alger players
21st-century Algerian people